Sea Shadow (IX-529) was an experimental stealth ship built by Lockheed for the United States Navy to determine how a low radar profile might be achieved and to test high stability hull configurations that have been used in oceanographic ships.

Development
Sea Shadow was built in 1984 to examine the application of stealth technology on naval vessels, and was used in secret until a public debut in 1993. In addition, the ship was designed to test the use of automation to reduce crew size. The ship was created by the Defense Advanced Research Projects Agency (DARPA), the U.S. Navy and Lockheed. Sea Shadow was developed and built at Lockheed's Redwood City, California facility, inside the Hughes Mining Barge (HMB-1), which functioned as a floating drydock during construction and testing.

History
Sea Shadow had a SWATH (small-waterplane-area twin hull) design. Below the water were submerged twin hulls, each with a propeller, aft stabilizer, and inboard hydrofoil. The portion of the ship above water was connected to the hulls via the two angled struts. The SWATH design helped the ship remain stable in rough water up to sea state 6 (wave height of 18 feet (5.5 m) or "very rough" sea). The shape of the superstructure was sometimes compared to the casemate of the ironclad ram  of the American Civil War.

Sea Shadow had 12 bunks, one small microwave oven, a refrigerator and table. It was not intended to be mission-capable and was never commissioned, although it is listed in the Naval Vessel Register.

Sea Shadow was revealed to the public in 1993, and was housed at the San Diego Naval Station until September 2006, when it was relocated with the Hughes Mining Barge to the Suisun Bay Reserve Fleet in Benicia, California. Until 2006, Sea Shadow and the HMB-1 were maintained and operated by Lockheed Martin for the US Navy. The vessels were available for donation to a maritime museum.

The USNS Impeccable and Victorious ocean surveillance ships have inherited the stabilizer and canard method to help perform their stability-sensitive intelligence collection missions.

In 2006, the U.S. Navy tried to sell Sea Shadow to the highest bidder; after the initial offering met with a lack of interest, it was listed for dismantling sale on gsaauctions.gov. The US government mandated that the buyer not sail the ship and be required to scrap it. The ship was finally sold in 2012. Sea Shadow was dismantled in 2012 by Bay Ship & Yacht Company.

In popular culture
In the 1997 James Bond film, Tomorrow Never Dies, the stealth ship is operated by the media tycoon Elliot Carver (Jonathan Pryce). Christened as Sea Dolphin II in the film, the secret and stealthy floating lair was used as a plot device to attempt to initiate World War III.

In the Strike series it appears in Urban Strike as a enemy unit & in Nuclear Strike as home base.

See also 
 Skjold-class corvette, the world's fastest warships, stealth missile coastal corvette in service with the Royal Norwegian Navy
 Visby-class corvette, a stealth ship currently in service within the Swedish Navy
 
 Sea Hunter

References

External links

Navy news article
Sea Shadow
"The Navy Has a Top-Secret Vessel It Wants to Put on Display" by Barry Newman - Wall Street Journal - February 24, 2009
Virtual Tour of Sea Shadow and HMB-1

Lockheed Martin
Sea Shadow
Sea Shadow
Small waterplane area twin hull vessels
1985 ships
High speed vessels of the United States Navy
Stealth ships
Ships built by Lockheed Shipbuilding and Construction Company
Catamarans of the United States Navy
Military catamarans
Experimental ships of the United States Navy